Ahmed Mohamed (born 24 October 1964) is an Egyptian fencer. He competed in the individual foil event at the 1988 Summer Olympics.

References

External links
 

1964 births
Living people
Egyptian male foil fencers
Olympic fencers of Egypt
Fencers at the 1988 Summer Olympics